Mount Crawford is the name of several places in the world including:

Mount Crawford (Antarctica)
Mount Crawford (New Hampshire) in the US White Mountains
Mount Crawford (South Australia) a hill in the Mount Lofty Ranges of Australia
Mount Crawford, South Australia, a locality containing the hill
Mount Crawford, Virginia, a town in the United States of America